Francis Saunderson (1754-1827) was an Anglo-Irish M.P. in both the Parliament of Ireland and the post-Acts of Union UK Parliament. He was a member of the Saunderson family seated at Castle Saunderson.

Saunderson attend Eton College. He was High Sheriff of Cavan from 1781 to 1782.

A Whig, he was a member of the Irish House of Commons from 1790 to 1797, and again from 1798 to its dissolution in 1801 (which he had voted against). He was then co-opted onto the first UK parliament for the Cavan constituency, and then elected in the 1802 general election.

Saunderson married Anne Bassett White of Miskin, Wales in August 1778 or 1779. Their son, Alexander, and grandson, Edward, also became MPs.

References

Politicians from County Cavan
People educated at Eton College
Whig (British political party) MPs for Irish constituencies
Irish landlords
High Sheriffs of Cavan
1754 births
1827 deaths
18th-century Anglo-Irish people
19th-century Anglo-Irish people
UK MPs 1801–1802
UK MPs 1802–1806
Members of the Parliament of the United Kingdom for County Cavan constituencies (1801–1922)